SCMP may stand for:
 South China Morning Post, Hong Kong newspaper
 SCMP Group, former publisher of the South China Morning Post, now known as Great Wall Pan Asia Holdings
 Simple Commerce Messaging Protocol
 Software Configuration Management Plan
 Stateless Certified Mail Protocol
Student Christian Movement of the Philippines

See also
 Scump (born 1995), Seth Abner, professional Call of Duty player